Jackson Township is a township in Jones County, Iowa.

History
Jackson Township was organized in 1851.

References

Populated places in Jones County, Iowa
Townships in Iowa